Articles related to Christianity include:

0–9 

 1 Esdras
 1 Maccabees
 17th-century denominations in England
 2 Baruch
 2 Esdras
 2 Maccabees
 3 Maccabees
 4 Baruch
 4 Maccabees

A 

 Abaddon
 Abbess
 Abbot
 Abdul Rahman Al Ghafiqi
 Abortion and Christianity
 Achaichus
 Action of Churches Together in Scotland
 Acts of the Apostles
 Additions to Daniel
 Adoration of the shepherds
 Advent
 Adventism
 Aeneas (biblical figure)
 Affinity (Christian organisation)
 African Methodist Episcopal Church
 African Methodist Episcopal Zion Church
 Agabus
 Agnus Dei
 Alexander (Ephesian)
 Alexander of Constantinople
 All Africa Conference of Churches
 Alliance of Baptists
 Alphaeus
 Alypius of Byzantium
 American-Canadian Macedonian Orthodox Diocese
 American Baptist Association
 American Baptist Churches USA
 Amish
 Anabaptism
 Ananias and Sapphira
 Ananias of Damascus
 Ananias son of Nedebaios
 Andrew the Apostle
 Andronicus of Pannonia
 Angel
 Anglican Church in North America
 Anglican Church of Australia
 Anglican Church of Canada
 Anglican Communion
 Anglicanism
 Anna the Prophetess
 Annas
 Anointing of Jesus
 Anselm of Canterbury
 Ante-Nicene Period
 Anti-Christian policies in the Roman Empire
 Antilegomena
 Antiochian Orthodox Archdiocese of Australia, New Zealand, and All Oceania
 Antiochian Orthodox Christian Archdiocese of North America
 Antipas of Pergamum
 Antonius Felix
 Antony I of Constantinople
 Antony II of Constantinople
 Apocalyptic literature
 Apollos
 Apostles
 Apostolic Age
 Apostolic Church of Pentecost
 Apostolic Fathers
 Archbishop
 Archbishop Atticus of Constantinople
 Archbishop Flavian of Constantinople
 Archbishop Maximianus of Constantinople
 Archbishop Maximus I of Constantinople
 Archbishop Nectarius of Constantinople
 Archbishop Sisinnius I of Constantinople
 Archdiocese of Thyateira and Great Britain
 Archippus
 Aretas IV Philopatris
 Arian controversy
 Arianism
 Aristarchus of Thessalonica
 Armenian Apostolic Church
 Arminianism
 Arrest of Jesus
 Arsacius of Tarsus
 Arsenios Autoreianos
 Ascension of Jesus
 Asia Pacific Baptist Federation
 Assemblies of God
 Assemblies of God in the United Kingdom
 Associated Presbyterian Churches
 Association of Baptist Churches in Ireland
 Association of Regular Baptist Churches
 Association of Vineyard Churches
 Assyrian Church of the East
 Athanasius of Alexandria
 Athenodorus of Byzantium
 Atonement in Christianity
 Augustine of Hippo
 Australian Christian Churches
 Australian Union Conference of Seventh-day Adventists
 Authorship of the Bible
 Avignon Papacy
 Azusa Street Revival

B 

 Baptism
 Baptism of Jesus
 Baptism of Poland
 Baptist
 Baptist Bible Fellowship International
 Baptist General Conference
 Baptist General Conference of Canada
 Baptist Missionary Association of America
 Baptist Union of Australia
 Baptist Union of Great Britain
 Baptist Union of Scotland
 Baptist Union of Wales
 Baptist World Alliance
 Baptists
 Barabbas
 Barnabas
 Bartholomew
 Bartholomew the Apostle
 Bartimaeus (Biblical character)
 Beatification
 Bel and the Dragon
 Bernard of Clairvaux
 Bible
 Bible chronology
 Bible prophecy
 Bible Student movement
 Bible translations into English
 Biblical apocrypha
 Biblical canon
 Biblical law in Christianity
 Biblical Magi
 Biblical manuscript
 Biblical studies
 Bishop
 Blastus
 Blind man of Bethsaida
 Bonaventure
 Book of Amos
 Book of Baruch
 Book of Common Prayer
 Book of Concord
 Book of Daniel
 Book of Deuteronomy
 Book of Enoch
 Book of Esther
 Book of Exodus
 Book of Ezekiel
 Book of Ezra
 Book of Genesis
 Book of Habakkuk
 Book of Haggai
 Book of Hosea
 Book of Isaiah
 Book of Jeremiah
 Book of Job
 Book of Joel
 Book of Jonah
 Book of Joshua
 Book of Judges
 Book of Judith
 Book of Lamentations
 Book of Leviticus
 Book of Malachi
 Book of Micah
 Book of Mormon
 Book of Nahum
 Book of Nehemiah
 Book of Numbers
 Book of Obadiah
 Book of Odes (Bible)
 Book of Proverbs
 Book of Revelation
 Book of Ruth
 Book of Tobit
 Book of Wisdom
 Book of Zechariah
 Book of Zephaniah
 Books of Chronicles
 Books of Kings
 Books of Samuel
 Books of the Bible
 Brethren in Christ Church
 Britain Yearly Meeting
 British Methodist Episcopal Church
 British New Church Movement
 British Orthodox Church
 Buddhism and Christianity
 Burial of Jesus
 Byzantine–Ottoman Wars
 Byzantine Empire
 Byzantine Iconoclasm
 Byzantium

C 

 Caiaphas
 Calendar of saints
 Calendar of saints (Anglican Church of Australia)
 Calendar of saints (Anglican Church of Canada)
 Calendar of saints (Anglican Church of Korea)
 Calendar of saints (Anglican Church of Southern Africa)
 Calendar of saints (Armenian Apostolic Church)
 Calendar of saints (Church of England)
 Calendar of saints (Episcopal Church)
 Calendar of saints (Hong Kong Sheng Kung Hui)
 Calendar of saints (Lutheran)
 Calendar of saints (Scottish Episcopal Church)
 Calvinism
 Camp meeting
 Canadian and American Reformed Churches
 Canadian Baptist Ministries
 Canadian Conference of Mennonite Brethren Churches
 Canadian Convention of Southern Baptists
 Canadian Council of Churches
 Canadian Yearly Meeting
 Canon (priest)
 Canonization
 Cardinal (Catholic Church)
 Castinus of Byzantium
 Categories of New Testament manuscripts
 Catholic Church
 Catholic Church by country
 Catholic Church in Australia
 Catholic Church in Canada
 Catholic Church in England and Wales
 Catholic Church in Ireland
 Catholic Church in Scotland
 Catholic Church in the United Kingdom
 Catholic Church in the United States
 Catholic Mariavite Church
 Catholicism
 Catholicos
 Celtic Christianity
 Celtic Orthodox Church
 Chaplain
 Chapters and verses of the Bible
 Charismatic Movement
 Charles de Steuben
 Charles Martel
 Christ (title)
 Christadelphians
 Christendom
 Christian and Missionary Alliance
 Christian apologetics
 Christian art
 Christian Church
 Christian Church (Disciples of Christ)
 Christian churches and churches of Christ
 Christian City Churches
 Christian Conference of Asia
 Christian denomination
 Christian Holiness Partnership
 Christian liturgy
 Christian martyrs
 Christian Methodist Episcopal Church
 Christian mission
 Christian monasticism
 Christian music
 Christian Outreach Centre
 Christian pacifism
 Christian prayer
 Christian Reformed Church in North America
 Christian Reformed Churches of Australia
 Christian revival
 Christian right
 Christian school
 Christian symbolism
 Christian theology
 Christian tradition
 Christian views on alcohol
 Christian views on astrology
 Christian views on cloning
 Christian views on contraception
 Christian views on marriage
 Christian views on sin
 Christianity
 Christianity among the Mongols
 Christianity and antisemitism
 Christianity and divorce
 Christianity and domestic violence
 Christianity and environmentalism
 Christianity and Freemasonry
 Christianity and Hinduism
 Christianity and homosexuality
 Christianity and Islam
 Christianity and Judaism
 Christianity and multiculturalism
 Christianity and Neoplatonism
 Christianity and other religions
 Christianity and Paganism
 Christianity and politics
 Christianity and slavery
 Christianity by country
 Christianity in Abkhazia
 Christianity in Afghanistan
 Christianity in Africa
 Christianity in Albania
 Christianity in Algeria
 Christianity in Angola
 Christianity in Argentina
 Christianity in Armenia
 Christianity in Asia
 Christianity in Australia
 Christianity in Azerbaijan
 Christianity in Bahrain
 Christianity in Bangladesh
 Christianity in Belarus
 Christianity in Benin
 Christianity in Bhutan
 Christianity in Botswana
 Christianity in Brunei
 Christianity in Burkina Faso
 Christianity in Burma
 Christianity in Burundi
 Christianity in Cambodia
 Christianity in Canada
 Christianity in Cape Verde
 Christianity in China
 Christianity in Colombia
 Christianity in Comoros
 Christianity in Cuba
 Christianity in Cyprus
 Christianity in Denmark
 Christianity in Djibouti
 Christianity in East Timor
 Christianity in Eastern Arabia
 Christianity in Egypt
 Christianity in England
 Christianity in Eritrea
 Christianity in Ethiopia
 Christianity in Europe
 Christianity in France
 Christianity in Georgia (country)
 Christianity in Germany
 Christianity in Ghana
 Christianity in Guinea-Bissau
 Christianity in Haiti
 Christianity in Hong Kong
 Christianity in India
 Christianity in Indonesia
 Christianity in Iran
 Christianity in Iraq
 Christianity in Ireland
 Christianity in Israel
 Christianity in Italy
 Christianity in Jamaica
 Christianity in Japan
 Christianity in Jordan
 Christianity in Kazakhstan
 Christianity in Korea
 Christianity in Kosovo
 Christianity in Kuwait
 Christianity in Kyrgyzstan
 Christianity in Laos
 Christianity in Lebanon
 Christianity in Libya
 Christianity in Lithuania
 Christianity in Macau
 Christianity in Malaysia
 Christianity in Malta
 Christianity in Mauritania
 Christianity in Mauritius
 Christianity in Mongolia
 Christianity in Montenegro
 Christianity in Morocco
 Christianity in Nepal
 Christianity in New Zealand
 Christianity in Niger
 Christianity in Nigeria
 Christianity in North Korea
 Christianity in North Macedonia
 Christianity in Norway
 Christianity in Oman
 Christianity in Pakistan
 Christianity in Palestine
 Christianity in Panama
 Christianity in Poland
 Christianity in Portugal
 Christianity in Qatar
 Christianity in Russia
 Christianity in Samoa
 Christianity in Saudi Arabia
 Christianity in Scotland
 Christianity in Serbia
 Christianity in Singapore
 Christianity in Somalia
 Christianity in Somaliland
 Christianity in South Korea
 Christianity in Sri Lanka
 Christianity in Sudan
 Christianity in Switzerland
 Christianity in Syria
 Christianity in Taiwan
 Christianity in Tajikistan
 Christianity in Tanzania
 Christianity in Thailand
 Christianity in the 10th century
 Christianity in the 11th century
 Christianity in the 12th century
 Christianity in the 13th century
 Christianity in the 14th century
 Christianity in the 15th century
 Christianity in the 16th century
 Christianity in the 17th century
 Christianity in the 18th century
 Christianity in the 19th century
 Christianity in the 1st century
 Christianity in the 20th century
 Christianity in the 21st century
 Christianity in the 2nd century
 Christianity in the 3rd century
 Christianity in the 4th century
 Christianity in the 5th century
 Christianity in the 6th century
 Christianity in the 7th century
 Christianity in the 8th century
 Christianity in the 9th century
 Christianity in the Democratic Republic of the Congo
 Christianity in the Gambia
 Christianity in the Maldives
 Christianity in the Middle East
 Christianity in the Philippines
 Christianity in the United Arab Emirates
 Christianity in the United Kingdom
 Christianity in the United States
 Christianity in Tokelau
 Christianity in Tunisia
 Christianity in Turkey
 Christianity in Turkmenistan
 Christianity in Ukraine
 Christianity in Uzbekistan
 Christianity in Vatican City
 Christianity in Vietnam
 Christianity in Wales
 Christianity in Western Sahara
 Christianity in Yemen
 Christianity in Zambia
 Christianity in Zimbabwe
 Christianization of Bulgaria
 Christianization of Hungary
 Christianization of Iceland
 Christianization of Kievan Rus'
 Christianization of Lithuania
 Christianization of Pomerania
 Christianization of Scandinavia
 Christianization of the Rus' Khaganate
 Christians
 Christmas
 Christmastide
 Christodoulos (Greek Orthodox patriarch of Alexandria)
 Christology
 Chronological list of saints and blesseds
 Chronological list of saints and blesseds in the 11th century
 Chronological list of saints and blesseds in the 12th century
 Chronological list of saints and blesseds in the 13th century
 Chronological list of saints and blesseds in the 14th century
 Chronological list of saints and blesseds in the 15th century
 Chronological list of saints and blesseds in the 16th century
 Chronological list of saints and blesseds in the 17th century
 Chronological list of saints and blesseds in the 18th century
 Chronological list of saints and blesseds in the 19th century
 Chronological list of saints and blesseds in the 20th century
 Chronological list of saints in the 10th century
 Chronological list of saints in the 1st century
 Chronological list of saints in the 2nd century
 Chronological list of saints in the 3rd century
 Chronological list of saints in the 4th century
 Chronological list of saints in the 5th century
 Chronological list of saints in the 6th century
 Chronological list of saints in the 7th century
 Chronological list of saints in the 8th century
 Chronological list of saints in the 9th century
 Chronology of Jesus
 Church Fathers
 Church in Wales
 Church of Christ (Latter Day Saints)
 Church of Christ, Scientist
 Church of England
 Church of God (Anderson, Indiana)
 Church of God (Cleveland, Tennessee)
 Church of God in Christ
 Church of God of Prophecy
 Church of Ireland
 Church of Scotland
 Church of the Brethren
 Church of the East
 Church of the Nazarene
 Church on the Rock International
 Church usher
 Churches of Christ
 Churches of Christ in Australia
 Churches Together in Britain and Ireland
 Churches Together in England
 Churches Uniting in Christ
 Churchwarden
 Circuit rider (religious)
 Claudius Lysias
 Cleansing of the Temple
 Cleopas
 Clopas
 Commissioning of the Twelve Apostles
 Communion of saints
 Community of Christ
 Conciliarism
 Conference of European Churches
 Confessional Evangelical Lutheran Conference
 Confessor of the Faith
 Congregation for the Causes of Saints
 Congregational church
 Congregational Federation
 Conrad Grebel
 Conservative Baptist Association of America
 Conservative Congregational Christian Conference
 Constantine I
 Constantine Leichoudes
 Constantine the Great
 Constantinople
 Continuing Anglican movement
 Coptic calendar
 Coptic history
 Coptic Orthodox Church in Australia
 Coptic Orthodox Church in Canada
 Coptic Orthodox Church of Alexandria
 Coptic versions of the Bible
 Cornelius the Centurion
 Council of Chalcedon
 Council of Ephesus
 Council of Jerusalem
 Council of Trent
 Counter-Reformation
 CRC Churches International
 Creed
 Crescens
 Criticism of Christianity
 Crown of thorns
 Crucifixion of Jesus
 Crusades
 Cumberland Presbyterian Church
 Curate
 Cursing the fig tree
 Cyriacus I of Byzantium
 Cyril Lucaris
 Cyril of Alexandria
 Cyrus of Alexandria
 Cytûn

D 

 Daughter of Jairus
 Deacon
 Deaconesses
 Dead Sea Scrolls
 Dean (Christianity)
 Demetrius (biblical figure)
 Demophilus of Constantinople
 Dependent territory
 Desert Fathers
 Desiderius Erasmus
 Deuterocanonical books
 Development of the Christian biblical canon
 Development of the New Testament canon
 Development of the Old Testament canon
 Devil in Christianity
 Diatessaron
 Diet of Worms
 Diogenes of Byzantium
 Dionysius the Areopagite
 Diotrephes
 Disciple (Christianity)
 Disciple whom Jesus loved
 Dissolution of the Monasteries
 Doctors of the Church
 Dometius of Byzantium
 Dorcas
 Drusilla (daughter of Herod Agrippa)

E 

 Early Christianity
 East–West Schism
 Easter
 Easter Triduum
 Eastern Catholic Churches
 Eastern Christianity
 Eastern Orthodox Church
 Eastern Orthodox Church organization
 Eastern Orthodox liturgical calendar
 Eastern Orthodoxy in Greece
 Ecclesiastes
 Ecumenical council
 Ecumenical Patriarch Bartholomew I of Constantinople
 Ecumenical Patriarch Callinicus III of Constantinople
 Ecumenical Patriarch Clement of Constantinople
 Ecumenical Patriarch Demetrios I of Constantinople
 Ecumenical Patriarch Dionysius IV of Constantinople
 Ecumenical Patriarch Methodius III of Constantinople
 Ecumenical Patriarch of Constantinople
 Ecumenical Patriarch Serapheim II of Constantinople
 Ecumenism
 Église réformée du Québec
 Elder (Christianity)
 Eleutherius of Byzantium
 Elim Pentecostal Church
 Elizabeth (biblical figure)
 Elizabethan Religious Settlement
 Elymas
 Emerging church
 Empire of Nicaea
 Empty tomb
 English Civil War
 English Reformation
 Epaphras
 Epaphroditus
 Episcopal Church (United States)
 Epistle
 Epistle of James
 Epistle of Jude
 Epistle to Philemon
 Epistle to the Colossians
 Epistle to the Ephesians
 Epistle to the Galatians
 Epistle to the Hebrews
 Epistle to the Philippians
 Epistle to the Romans
 Epistle to Titus
 Erastus of Corinth
 Ethiopian eunuch
 Ethiopian Orthodox Tewahedo Church
 Eucharistic theology
 Eudoxius of Antioch
 Eulogius of Alexandria
 Euodia and Syntyche
 European Baptist Federation
 European wars of religion
 Eusebius of Nicomedia
 Eustratius Garidas
 Eutychus
 Euzois of Byzantium
 Evagrius of Constantinople
 Evangelical Alliance
 Evangelical Christian Church in Canada
 Evangelical Covenant Church
 Evangelical Free Church of America
 Evangelical Free Church of Canada
 Evangelical Friends Church International
 Evangelical Lutheran Church in America
 Evangelical Lutheran Church in Canada
 Evangelical Lutheran Church of England
 Evangelical Movement of Wales
 Evangelical Presbyterian Church (United States)
 Evangelical Presbyterian Church in England and Wales
 Evangelicalism
 Evangelism
 Exarch

F 

 Faith in Christianity
 Felix of Byzantium
 Fellowship of Congregational Churches
 Fellowship of Evangelical Baptist Churches in Canada
 Fellowship of Grace Brethren Churches
 Fellowship of Independent Evangelical Churches
 First Council of Constantinople
 First Council of Nicaea
 First Epistle of John
 First Epistle of Peter
 First Epistle to the Corinthians
 First Epistle to the Thessalonians
 First Epistle to Timothy
 First Great Awakening
 First seven Ecumenical Councils
 First Vatican Council
 Five solae
 Flagellation of Christ
 Four Evangelists
 Four Horsemen of the Apocalypse
 Fourth Council of the Lateran
 Fourth Great Awakening
 Foxe's Book of Martyrs
 Francis of Assisi
 Francis Xavier
 Free Church of England
 Free Church of Scotland (Continuing)
 Free Church of Scotland (since 1900)
 Free Methodist
 Free Methodist Church
 Free Methodist Church in Canada
 Free Presbyterian Church of Scotland
 Free Presbyterian Church of Ulster
 Friar
 Friends General Conference
 Friends United Meeting
 Friends World Committee for Consultation

G 

 Gabriel
 Gamaliel
 Genealogies in the Bible
 General Association of Regular Baptist Churches
 General Council of the Assemblies of God in the United States of America
 General epistles
 General Roman Calendar
 General Roman Calendar of 1954
 General Roman Calendar of 1960
 General Roman Calendar of 1969
 General Roman Calendar of Pope Pius XII
 General Superintendent (Church of the Nazarene)
 Gennadius of Constantinople
 Gennadius Scholarius
 Germanic Christianity
 Gnosticism and the New Testament
 God-fearer
 God in Christianity
 God the Father
 God the Son
 Good Friday
 Gospel
 Gospel harmony
 Gospel of John
 Gospel of Luke
 Gospel of Mark
 Gospel of Matthew
 Gothic Christianity
 Great Commission
 Greek Orthodox Archdiocese of America
 Greek Orthodox Archdiocese of Australia
 Gregory of Nazianzus

H 

 Hagiography
 Henry VIII of England
 Herod Agrippa
 Herod Agrippa II
 Herod Antipas
 Herod Archelaus
 Herod Philip II
 Herod the Great
 Herodian dynasty
 Herodians
 Herodias
 Historical background of the New Testament
 Historical development of the doctrine of papal primacy
 Historical Jesus
 Historicity of the Bible
 History of Arab Christians
 History of Calvinism
 History of Christian theology
 History of Christianity
 History of Christianity during the Middle Ages
 History of Christianity in Romania
 History of Christianity in Scotland
 History of Christianity in the United States
 History of Christianity in Ukraine
 History of early Christianity
 History of Eastern Christianity
 History of Jehovah's Witnesses
 History of late ancient Christianity
 History of modern Christianity
 History of Oriental Orthodoxy
 History of Protestantism
 History of the Anglican Communion
 History of the Calvinist–Arminian debate
 History of the Catholic Church
 History of the Church of England
 History of the Eastern Orthodox Church under the Ottoman Empire
 History of the Latter Day Saint movement
 History of the Eastern Orthodox Church
 History of the papacy
 History of the Puritans
 History of the Quakers
 History of the Russian Orthodox Church
 History of the Seventh-day Adventist Church
 Holiness movement
 Holy Chalice
 Holy Saturday
 Holy Spirit
 Holy Spirit in Christianity
 Hutterite
 Hymenaeus (biblical figure)

I 

 Ichthus Christian Fellowship
 Iglesia ni Cristo
 Ignatius of Antioch
 Impenitent thief
 Independent Catholic churches
 Independent Fundamental Churches of America
 Inquisition
 Intercession of saints
 International Church of the Foursquare Gospel
 International Churches of Christ
 International Conference of Reformed Churches
 International Council of Community Churches
 International Lutheran Council
 International Pentecostal Holiness Church
 Investiture Controversy
 Ireland Yearly Meeting
 Irenaeus

J 

 James, brother of Jesus
 James, son of Alphaeus
 James, son of Zebedee
 Jan Hus
 Jansenism
 Jason of Tarsus
 Jehovah's Witnesses
 Jerome
 Jesus
 Jesus in Christianity
 Jesus Justus
 Jesus movement
 Joachim
 Joanna, wife of Chuza
 Johannine epistles
 John Calvin
 John Chrysostom
 John Knox
 John Mark
 John of Cappadocia
 John of Patmos
 John Scholasticus
 John Smyth (Baptist minister)
 John the Apostle
 John the Baptist
 John the Evangelist
 John the Merciful
 John VI of Constantinople
 John Wycliffe
 John X of Constantinople
 Joseph Barsabbas
 Joseph of Arimathea
 Joses
 Jubilees
 Judas Barsabbas
 Judas Iscariot
 Judas of Galilee
 Judas the Zealot
 Jude the Apostle
 Jude, brother of Jesus
 Junia
 Junius Annaeus Gallio
 Justin Martyr

K 

 Kingship and kingdom of God
 Korean Presbyterian Church in America
 Kyros of Constantinople

L 

 Last supper
 Latter Day Saint movement
 Laurence of Byzantium
 Lazarus of Bethany
 Legion (demons)
 Letter of Jeremiah
 Liberation Theology
 Life of Jesus in the New Testament
 List of Abunas of Ethiopia
 List of Anglican Church calendars
 List of Anglicans
 List of Armenian Patriarchs of Constantinople
 List of artifacts significant to the Bible
 List of Assemblies of God people
 List of Australian Presbyterians
 List of Baptists
 List of bishops and patriarchs of Aquileia
 List of burial places of biblical figures
 List of Catholicoi of Armenia
 List of Catholicos of the East
 List of Christian denominations
 List of Christian martyrs
 List of Christian movements
 List of Church Fathers
 List of Coptic Catholic Patriarchs of Alexandria
 List of Coptic Orthodox Popes of Alexandria
 List of current patriarchs
 List of early Christian saints
 List of early Christian writers
 List of Eastern Orthodox Christians
 List of Ecumenical Patriarchs of Constantinople
 List of English Bible translations
 List of evangelical Christians
 List of Greek Orthodox Patriarchs of Alexandria
 List of Greek Orthodox Patriarchs of Antioch
 List of Irish Presbyterians
 List of Latter Day Saints
 List of Lutheran clergy
 List of Lutheran denominations
 List of Maronite Patriarchs
 List of Melkite Greek Catholic Patriarchs of Antioch
 List of members of the Assyrian Church of the East
 List of Mennonites
 List of Methodists
 List of Metropolitans and Patriarchs of Moscow
 List of patriarchs of Alexandria
 List of patriarchs of Antioch
 List of patriarchs of the Bulgarian Orthodox Church
 List of patriarchs of the Church of the East
 List of popes
 List of Presbyterian denominations in Australia
 List of Protestant Reformers
 List of Puritans
 List of Reformed denominations
 List of saints
 List of Seventh-day Adventists
 List of Syriac Orthodox Patriarchs of Antioch
 Lists of Christians
 Lists of Roman Catholics
 Liturgical year
 Lucius of Cyrene
 Luke Chrysoberges
 Luke the Evangelist
 Lutheran Church–Canada
 Lutheran Church–Missouri Synod
 Lutheran Church in Great Britain
 Lutheran Church of Australia
 Lutheran orthodoxy
 Lutheran World Federation
 Lutheranism
 Lydia of Thyatira
 Lysanias

M 

 Macedonius I of Constantinople
 Mainline Protestant
 Major prophet
 Malankara Orthodox Syrian Church
 Malchus
 Manahen
 Marcionism
 Marcus I of Byzantium
 Mariavite Church
 Mark the Evangelist
 Martha
 Martin Luther
 Martyr
 Martyrs' Synod
 Mary Magdalene
 Mary of Bethany
 Mary of Clopas
 Mary of Rome
 Mary, mother of James
 Mary, mother of Jesus
 Mary, mother of John Mark
 Masoretic Text
 Matthew the Apostle
 Matthew the Evangelist
 Menno Simons
 Mennonite
 Mennonite Church Canada
 Mennonite Church USA
 Mennonite World Conference
 Meqabyan
 Messiah
 Messianic Jewish Alliance of America
 Methodios I of Constantinople
 Methodism
 Methodist Church in Ireland
 Methodist Church of Great Britain
 Metrophanes of Byzantium
 Michael (archangel)
 Michael I Cerularius
 Middle Ages
 Middle East Council of Churches
 Millerism
 Minister (Christianity)
 Ministry of Jesus
 Minor prophet
 Miracles of Jesus
 Missionary
 Modernism in the Catholic Church
 Monk
 Monotheism
 Montanism
 Moravian Church
 Mormonism and Christianity
 Muratorian fragment
 Myrrhbearers

N 

 National Association of Congregational Christian Churches
 National Association of Evangelicals
 National Association of Free Will Baptists
 National Baptist Convention of America, Inc.
 National Baptist Convention, USA, Inc.
 National Council of Churches
 National Council of Churches in Australia
 National Missionary Baptist Convention of America
 National Primitive Baptist Convention of the U.S.A.
 Nativity of Jesus
 Neoplatonism Christian
 Neo-Lutheranism
 Nestorianism
 Nestorius
 New Covenant
 New Testament
 Newfrontiers
 Nicene Creed
 Nicholas Mystikos
 Nicholas the Deacon
 Nicodemus
 Nicodemus ben Gurion
 Nikephoros I of Constantinople
 Ninety-five Theses
 Non-canonical books referenced in the Bible
 Non-subscribing Presbyterian Church of Ireland
 Nondenominational Christianity
 Nontrinitarianism
 North American Baptist Conference
 North American Presbyterian and Reformed Council
 Nymphas

O 

 Old Baptist Union
 Old Catholic Church
 Old Lutherans
 Old Testament
 Olympianus of Byzantium
 Oneness Pentecostalism
 Onesimus
 Open Brethren
 Oriental Orthodoxy
 Origen
 Origen of Alexandria
 Orthodox Church in America
 Orthodox Tewahedo biblical canon
 Ottoman Empire
 Our Lady of Guadalupe
 Outline of Christian theology
 Outline of religion
 Outline of spirituality

P 

 Pacific Conference of Churches
 Palm Sunday
 Parables of Jesus
 Paraclete
 Passion bearer
 Passion of Jesus
 Passover (Christian holiday)
 Pastor
 Pastoral epistles
 Patriarch
 Patriarch Acacius of Constantinople
 Patriarch Alexander II of Alexandria
 Patriarch Alexius of Constantinople
 Patriarch Anastasius of Constantinople
 Patriarch Anatolius of Constantinople
 Patriarch Anthimus I of Constantinople
 Patriarch Anthimus II of Constantinople
 Patriarch Anthimus IV of Constantinople
 Patriarch Anthimus V of Constantinople
 Patriarch Anthimus VI of Constantinople
 Patriarch Anthimus VII of Constantinople
 Patriarch Antony III of Constantinople
 Patriarch Antony IV of Constantinople
 Patriarch Apollinarius of Alexandria
 Patriarch Arsenius of Alexandria
 Patriarch Artemius of Alexandria
 Patriarch Athanasius I of Constantinople
 Patriarch Athanasius III of Alexandria
 Patriarch Athanasius IV of Alexandria
 Patriarch Athenagoras I of Constantinople
 Patriarch Basil I of Constantinople
 Patriarch Basil II of Constantinople
 Patriarch Basil III of Constantinople
 Patriarch Benjamin I of Constantinople
 Patriarch Callinicus I of Constantinople
 Patriarch Callinicus IV of Constantinople
 Patriarch Callinicus of Alexandria
 Patriarch Callistus I of Constantinople
 Patriarch Christopher I of Alexandria
 Patriarch Christopher II of Alexandria
 Patriarch Constantine I of Constantinople
 Patriarch Constantine II of Constantinople
 Patriarch Constantine V of Constantinople
 Patriarch Constantine VI of Constantinople
 Patriarch Cosmas I of Alexandria
 Patriarch Cosmas I of Constantinople
 Patriarch Cosmas II of Constantinople
 Patriarch Cosmas III of Alexandria
 Patriarch Cosmas III of Constantinople
 Patriarch Cyprian of Alexandria
 Patriarch Cyriacus II of Constantinople
 Patriarch Cyril II of Alexandria
 Patriarch Cyril III of Constantinople
 Patriarch Cyril V of Constantinople
 Patriarch Cyril VII of Constantinople
 Patriarch Dionysius I of Constantinople
 Patriarch Dionysius II of Constantinople
 Patriarch Dionysius V of Constantinople
 Patriarch Eleutherius of Alexandria
 Patriarch Elias I of Alexandria
 Patriarch Elias II of Alexandria
 Patriarch Epiphanius of Constantinople
 Patriarch Eugenius II of Constantinople
 Patriarch Euphemius of Constantinople
 Patriarch Eustathius of Constantinople
 Patriarch Eustatius of Alexandria
 Patriarch Euthymius I of Constantinople
 Patriarch Eutychius of Alexandria
 Patriarch Eutychius of Constantinople
 Patriarch Fravitta of Constantinople
 Patriarch Gabriel II of Constantinople
 Patriarch Gabriel III of Constantinople
 Patriarch George I of Alexandria
 Patriarch George I of Constantinople
 Patriarch George II of Alexandria
 Patriarch George II of Constantinople
 Patriarch Gerasimus I of Alexandria
 Patriarch Gerasimus I of Constantinople
 Patriarch Gerasimus II of Alexandria
 Patriarch Gerasimus III of Alexandria
 Patriarch Germanus I of Constantinople
 Patriarch Germanus II of Constantinople
 Patriarch Germanus IV of Constantinople
 Patriarch Germanus V of Constantinople
 Patriarch Gregory I of Alexandria
 Patriarch Gregory II of Alexandria
 Patriarch Gregory II of Constantinople
 Patriarch Gregory III of Alexandria
 Patriarch Gregory III of Constantinople
 Patriarch Gregory IV of Alexandria
 Patriarch Gregory IV of Constantinople
 Patriarch Gregory V of Alexandria
 Patriarch Gregory V of Constantinople
 Patriarch Gregory VII of Constantinople
 Patriarch Hierotheus I of Alexandria
 Patriarch Hierotheus II of Alexandria
 Patriarch Ignatius of Constantinople
 Patriarch Isaac of Alexandria
 Patriarch Isaias of Constantinople
 Patriarch Isidore I of Constantinople
 Patriarch Isidore II of Constantinople
 Patriarch Jacob of Alexandria
 Patriarch Jeremias I of Constantinople
 Patriarch Jeremias II of Constantinople
 Patriarch Jeremias III of Constantinople
 Patriarch Joachim I of Constantinople
 Patriarch Joachim II of Constantinople
 Patriarch Joachim III of Constantinople
 Patriarch Joachim IV of Constantinople
 Patriarch Joachim of Alexandria
 Patriarch Joannicius I of Constantinople
 Patriarch Joannicius II of Constantinople
 Patriarch Joannicius III of Constantinople
 Patriarch Joannicius of Alexandria
 Patriarch Joasaph I of Constantinople
 Patriarch Joasaph II of Constantinople
 Patriarch Job of Alexandria
 Patriarch John I of Alexandria
 Patriarch John IV of Alexandria
 Patriarch John IV of Constantinople
 Patriarch John IX of Constantinople
 Patriarch John V of Constantinople
 Patriarch John VI of Alexandria
 Patriarch John VII of Constantinople
 Patriarch John VIII of Constantinople
 Patriarch John XI of Constantinople
 Patriarch John XII of Constantinople
 Patriarch John XIII of Constantinople
 Patriarch John XIV of Constantinople
 Patriarch Joseph II of Constantinople
 Patriarch Leo of Constantinople
 Patriarch Leontius of Alexandria
 Patriarch Macedonius II of Constantinople
 Patriarch Manuel I of Constantinople
 Patriarch Manuel II of Constantinople
 Patriarch Mark II of Constantinople
 Patriarch Mark III of Alexandria
 Patriarch Mark IV of Alexandria
 Patriarch Mark V of Alexandria
 Patriarch Mark VI of Alexandria
 Patriarch Matthew II of Constantinople
 Patriarch Matthew of Alexandria
 Patriarch Maximus II of Constantinople
 Patriarch Maximus III of Constantinople
 Patriarch Maximus IV of Constantinople
 Patriarch Maximus V of Constantinople
 Patriarch Meletius I Pegas
 Patriarch Meletius III of Constantinople
 Patriarch Meletius IV of Constantinople
 Patriarch Menas of Constantinople
 Patriarch Metrophanes II of Constantinople
 Patriarch Metrophanes III of Constantinople
 Patriarch Metrophanes of Alexandria
 Patriarch Michael I of Alexandria
 Patriarch Michael II of Alexandria
 Patriarch Michael II of Constantinople
 Patriarch Michael IV of Constantinople
 Patriarch Neophytus V of Constantinople
 Patriarch Neophytus VI of Constantinople
 Patriarch Neophytus VIII of Constantinople
 Patriarch Nephon I of Constantinople
 Patriarch Nephon II of Constantinople
 Patriarch Nicanor of Alexandria
 Patriarch Nicephorus of Alexandria
 Patriarch Nicetas I of Constantinople
 Patriarch Nicholas I of Alexandria
 Patriarch Nicholas II of Alexandria
 Patriarch Nicholas II of Constantinople
 Patriarch Nicholas III of Alexandria
 Patriarch Nicholas III of Constantinople
 Patriarch Nicholas IV of Alexandria
 Patriarch Nicholas IV of Constantinople
 Patriarch Nicholas V of Alexandria
 Patriarch Nicholas VI of Alexandria
 Patriarch Nilus of Constantinople
 Patriarch Niphon of Alexandria
 Patriarch of Alexandria
 Patriarch Pachomius I of Constantinople
 Patriarch Pachomius II of Constantinople
 Patriarch Paisius II of Constantinople
 Patriarch Paisius of Alexandria
 Patriarch Parthenius I of Alexandria
 Patriarch Parthenius II of Alexandria
 Patriarch Parthenius III of Alexandria
 Patriarch Parthenius III of Constantinople
 Patriarch Paul II of Constantinople
 Patriarch Paul III of Constantinople
 Patriarch Paul IV of Constantinople
 Patriarch Paul of Alexandria
 Patriarch Peter IV of Alexandria
 Patriarch Peter of Constantinople
 Patriarch Peter V of Alexandria
 Patriarch Peter VI of Alexandria
 Patriarch Peter VII of Alexandria
 Patriarch Philotheus I of Constantinople
 Patriarch Philotheus of Alexandria
 Patriarch Photios II of Constantinople
 Patriarch Photius of Alexandria
 Patriarch Politianus of Alexandria
 Patriarch Polyeuctus of Constantinople
 Patriarch Pyrrhus of Constantinople
 Patriarch Raphael I of Constantinople
 Patriarch Raphael II of Constantinople
 Patriarch Sabbas of Alexandria
 Patriarch Samuel of Alexandria
 Patriarch Sergius II of Constantinople
 Patriarch Silvester of Alexandria
 Patriarch Sisinnius II of Constantinople
 Patriarch Sophronius I of Alexandria
 Patriarch Sophronius I of Constantinople
 Patriarch Sophronius II of Alexandria
 Patriarch Sophronius III of Alexandria
 Patriarch Sophronius III of Constantinople
 Patriarch Stephen II of Constantinople
 Patriarch Symeon I of Constantinople
 Patriarch Tarasios of Constantinople
 Patriarch Theodore I of Alexandria
 Patriarch Theodore I of Constantinople
 Patriarch Theodore II of Alexandria
 Patriarch Theodosius I of Constantinople
 Patriarch Theoleptus I of Constantinople
 Patriarch Theoleptus II of Constantinople
 Patriarch Theophilus III of Alexandria
 Patriarch Theophilus II of Alexandria
 Patriarch Theophylact of Constantinople
 Patriarch Thomas I of Constantinople
 Patriarch Thomas II of Constantinople
 Patriarch Timothy I of Constantinople
 Patriarch Timothy II of Constantinople
 Patriarch Timothy III of Alexandria
 Patriarch Tryphon of Constantinople
 Patriarch Zoilus of Alexandria
 Patristics
 Patron saint
 Paul I of Constantinople
 Paul the Apostle
 Pauline epistles
 Pelagianism
 Penitent thief
 Pentateuch
 Pentecostal Assemblies of Canada
 Pentecostal Assemblies of the World
 Pentecostal Church of God
 Pentecostal World Conference
 Pentecostalism
 Pertinax of Byzantium
 Peshitta
 Peter Abelard
 Pharisees
 Philadelphus of Byzantium
 Philetus (biblical figure)
 Philip the Apostle
 Philip the Evangelist
 Philipp Melanchthon
 Phoebe (biblical figure)
 Photios I of Constantinople
 Pietism
 Pietist
 Pilate's court
 Plutarch of Byzantium
 Plymouth Brethren
 Polish National Catholic Church
 Polycarpus I of Byzantium
 Polycarpus II of Byzantium
 Pontius Pilate
 Pontius Pilate's wife
 Pope
 Pope Abraham of Alexandria
 Pope Achillas of Alexandria
 Pope Adeodatus I
 Pope Adeodatus II
 Pope Adrian I
 Pope Adrian II
 Pope Adrian III
 Pope Adrian IV
 Pope Adrian V
 Pope Adrian VI
 Pope Agapetus I
 Pope Agapetus II
 Pope Agatho
 Pope Agatho of Alexandria
 Pope Agrippinus of Alexandria
 Pope Alexander I
 Pope Alexander I of Alexandria
 Pope Alexander II
 Pope Alexander II of Alexandria
 Pope Alexander III
 Pope Alexander IV
 Pope Alexander VI
 Pope Alexander VII
 Pope Alexander VIII
 Pope Anacletus
 Pope Anastasius I
 Pope Anastasius II
 Pope Anastasius III
 Pope Anastasius IV
 Pope Anastasius of Alexandria
 Pope Andronicus of Alexandria
 Pope Anianus of Alexandria
 Pope Anicetus
 Pope Anterus
 Pope Athanasius II of Alexandria
 Pope Athanasius III of Alexandria
 Pope Avilius of Alexandria
 Pope Benedict I
 Pope Benedict II
 Pope Benedict III
 Pope Benedict IV
 Pope Benedict IX
 Pope Benedict V
 Pope Benedict VI
 Pope Benedict VII
 Pope Benedict VIII
 Pope Benedict XI
 Pope Benedict XII
 Pope Benedict XIII
 Pope Benedict XIV
 Pope Benedict XV
 Pope Benedict XVI
 Pope Benjamin I of Alexandria
 Pope Benjamin II of Alexandria
 Pope Boniface I
 Pope Boniface II
 Pope Boniface III
 Pope Boniface IV
 Pope Boniface IX
 Pope Boniface V
 Pope Boniface VI
 Pope Boniface VIII
 Pope Caius
 Pope Callixtus I
 Pope Callixtus II
 Pope Callixtus III
 Pope Celadion of Alexandria
 Pope Celestine I
 Pope Celestine II
 Pope Celestine III
 Pope Celestine IV
 Pope Celestine V
 Pope Christodolos of Alexandria
 Pope Clement I
 Pope Clement II
 Pope Clement III
 Pope Clement IV
 Pope Clement IX
 Pope Clement V
 Pope Clement VI
 Pope Clement VII
 Pope Clement VIII
 Pope Clement X
 Pope Clement XI
 Pope Clement XII
 Pope Clement XIII
 Pope Clement XIV
 Pope Conon
 Pope Constantine
 Pope Cornelius
 Pope Cosmas I of Alexandria
 Pope Cosmas II of Alexandria
 Pope Cosmas III of Alexandria
 Pope Cyril II of Alexandria
 Pope Cyril III of Alexandria
 Pope Cyril IV of Alexandria
 Pope Cyril V of Alexandria
 Pope Cyril VI of Alexandria
 Pope Damasus I
 Pope Damasus II
 Pope Damian of Alexandria
 Pope Demetrius I of Alexandria
 Pope Demetrius II of Alexandria
 Pope Dionysius
 Pope Dionysius of Alexandria
 Pope Dioscorus I of Alexandria
 Pope Dioscorus II of Alexandria
 Pope Donus
 Pope Eleuterus
 Pope Eugene I
 Pope Eugene II
 Pope Eugene III
 Pope Eugene IV
 Pope Eumenes of Alexandria
 Pope Eusebius
 Pope Eutychian
 Pope Evaristus
 Pope Fabian
 Pope Felix I
 Pope Felix III
 Pope Felix IV
 Pope Formosus
 Pope Gabriel I of Alexandria
 Pope Gabriel II of Alexandria
 Pope Gabriel III of Alexandria
 Pope Gabriel IV of Alexandria
 Pope Gabriel V of Alexandria
 Pope Gabriel VI of Alexandria
 Pope Gabriel VII of Alexandria
 Pope Gabriel VIII of Alexandria
 Pope Gelasius I
 Pope Gelasius II
 Pope Gregory I
 Pope Gregory II
 Pope Gregory III
 Pope Gregory IV
 Pope Gregory IX
 Pope Gregory V
 Pope Gregory VI
 Pope Gregory VII
 Pope Gregory VIII
 Pope Gregory X
 Pope Gregory XI
 Pope Gregory XII
 Pope Gregory XIII
 Pope Gregory XIV
 Pope Gregory XV
 Pope Gregory XVI
 Pope Heraclas of Alexandria
 Pope Hilarius
 Pope Honorius I
 Pope Honorius II
 Pope Honorius III
 Pope Honorius IV
 Pope Hormisdas
 Pope Hyginus
 Pope Innocent I
 Pope Innocent II
 Pope Innocent III
 Pope Innocent IV
 Pope Innocent IX
 Pope Innocent V
 Pope Innocent VI
 Pope Innocent VII
 Pope Innocent VIII
 Pope Innocent X
 Pope Innocent XI
 Pope Innocent XII
 Pope Innocent XIII
 Pope Isaac of Alexandria
 Pope Jacob of Alexandria
 Pope John I
 Pope John I (II) of Alexandria
 Pope John II
 Pope John II (III) of Alexandria
 Pope John III
 Pope John III of Alexandria
 Pope John IV
 Pope John IV of Alexandria
 Pope John IX
 Pope John IX of Alexandria
 Pope John Paul I
 Pope John Paul II
 Pope John V
 Pope John V of Alexandria
 Pope John VI
 Pope John VI of Alexandria
 Pope John VII
 Pope John VII of Alexandria
 Pope John VIII
 Pope John VIII of Alexandria
 Pope John X
 Pope John X of Alexandria
 Pope John XI
 Pope John XI of Alexandria
 Pope John XII
 Pope John XII of Alexandria
 Pope John XIII
 Pope John XIII of Alexandria
 Pope John XIV
 Pope John XIV of Alexandria
 Pope John XIX
 Pope John XIX of Alexandria
 Pope John XV
 Pope John XV of Alexandria
 Pope John XVI of Alexandria
 Pope John XVII
 Pope John XVII of Alexandria
 Pope John XVIII
 Pope John XVIII of Alexandria
 Pope John XXI
 Pope John XXII
 Pope John XXIII
 Pope Joseph I of Alexandria
 Pope Joseph II of Alexandria
 Pope Julian of Alexandria
 Pope Julius I
 Pope Julius II
 Pope Julius III
 Pope Justus of Alexandria
 Pope Kedron of Alexandria
 Pope Lando
 Pope Leo I
 Pope Leo II
 Pope Leo III
 Pope Leo IV
 Pope Leo IX
 Pope Leo V
 Pope Leo VI
 Pope Leo VII
 Pope Leo VIII
 Pope Leo X
 Pope Leo XI
 Pope Leo XII
 Pope Leo XIII
 Pope Liberius
 Pope Linus
 Pope Lucius I
 Pope Lucius II
 Pope Lucius III
 Pope Macarius I of Alexandria
 Pope Macarius II of Alexandria
 Pope Macarius III of Alexandria
 Pope Marcellinus
 Pope Marcellus I
 Pope Marcellus II
 Pope Marinus I
 Pope Marinus II
 Pope Mark
 Pope Mark II of Alexandria
 Pope Mark III of Alexandria
 Pope Mark IV of Alexandria
 Pope Mark V of Alexandria
 Pope Mark VI of Alexandria
 Pope Mark VII of Alexandria
 Pope Mark VIII of Alexandria
 Pope Markianos of Alexandria
 Pope Martin I
 Pope Martin IV
 Pope Martin V
 Pope Matthew I of Alexandria
 Pope Matthew II of Alexandria
 Pope Matthew III of Alexandria
 Pope Matthew IV of Alexandria
 Pope Maximus of Alexandria
 Pope Michael I of Alexandria
 Pope Michael II of Alexandria
 Pope Michael III of Alexandria
 Pope Michael IV of Alexandria
 Pope Michael V of Alexandria
 Pope Michael VI of Alexandria
 Pope Miltiades
 Pope Mina I of Alexandria
 Pope Mina II of Alexandria
 Pope Nicholas I
 Pope Nicholas II
 Pope Nicholas III
 Pope Nicholas IV
 Pope Nicholas V
 Pope Paschal I
 Pope Paschal II
 Pope Paul I
 Pope Paul II
 Pope Paul III
 Pope Paul IV
 Pope Paul V
 Pope Paul VI
 Pope Pelagius I
 Pope Pelagius II
 Pope Peter I of Alexandria
 Pope Peter II of Alexandria
 Pope Peter III of Alexandria
 Pope Peter IV of Alexandria
 Pope Peter V of Alexandria
 Pope Peter VI of Alexandria
 Pope Peter VII of Alexandria
 Pope Philotheos of Alexandria
 Pope Pius I
 Pope Pius II
 Pope Pius III
 Pope Pius IV
 Pope Pius IX
 Pope Pius V
 Pope Pius VI
 Pope Pius VII
 Pope Pius VIII
 Pope Pius X
 Pope Pius XI
 Pope Pius XII
 Pope Pontian
 Pope Primus of Alexandria
 Pope Romanus
 Pope Sabinian
 Pope Sergius I
 Pope Sergius II
 Pope Sergius III
 Pope Sergius IV
 Pope Severinus
 Pope Shenouda I of Alexandria
 Pope Shenouda II of Alexandria
 Pope Shenouda III of Alexandria
 Pope Silverius
 Pope Simeon I of Alexandria
 Pope Simeon II of Alexandria
 Pope Simplicius
 Pope Siricius
 Pope Sisinnius
 Pope Sixtus I
 Pope Sixtus II
 Pope Sixtus III
 Pope Sixtus IV
 Pope Sixtus V
 Pope Soter
 Pope Stephen I
 Pope Stephen II
 Pope Stephen III
 Pope Stephen IV
 Pope Stephen IX
 Pope Stephen V
 Pope Stephen VI
 Pope Stephen VII
 Pope Stephen VIII
 Pope Sylvester I
 Pope Sylvester II
 Pope Sylvester III
 Pope Symmachus
 Pope Telesphorus
 Pope Theodore I
 Pope Theodore II
 Pope Theodosius I of Alexandria
 Pope Theodosius II of Alexandria
 Pope Theodosius III of Alexandria
 Pope Theonas of Alexandria
 Pope Theophilus II of Alexandria
 Pope Theophilus of Alexandria
 Pope Timothy I of Alexandria
 Pope Timothy II of Alexandria
 Pope Timothy III of Alexandria
 Pope Urban I
 Pope Urban II
 Pope Urban III
 Pope Urban IV
 Pope Urban V
 Pope Urban VI
 Pope Urban VII
 Pope Urban VIII
 Pope Valentine
 Pope Victor I
 Pope Victor II
 Pope Victor III
 Pope Vigilius
 Pope Vitalian
 Pope Zacharias of Alexandria
 Pope Zachary
 Pope Zephyrinus
 Pope Zosimus
 Porcius Festus
 Post-resurrection appearances of Jesus
 Prayer of Manasseh
 Preacher
 Presbyter
 Presbyterian Church (USA)
 Presbyterian Church in America
 Presbyterian Church in Canada
 Presbyterian Church in Ireland
 Presbyterian Church of Australia
 Presbyterian Church of Wales
 Presbyterianism
 Priest
 Primate (bishop)
 Priscilla and Aquila
 Proclus of Constantinople
 Progressive National Baptist Convention
 Proselyte
 Proterius of Alexandria
 Protestantism
 Protestantism and Islam
 Protestantism by country
 Protocanonical books
 Psalm 151
 Psalms
 Puritans

Q 

 Quakers
 Quirinius

R 

 Radical Reformation
 Raising of the son of the widow of Nain
 Raphael
 Rector (ecclesiastical)
 Reformation
 Reformation in Switzerland
 Reformed Church in America
 Reformed Ecumenical Council
 Reformed Presbyterian churches
 Rejection of Jesus
 Relations between Eastern Orthodoxy and Judaism
 Religion in Albania
 Religion in Antigua and Barbuda
 Religion in Austria
 Religion in Azerbaijan
 Religion in Belgium
 Religion in Bosnia and Herzegovina
 Religion in Brazil
 Religion in Bulgaria
 Religion in Cameroon
 Religion in Canada
 Religion in Cape Verde
 Religion in Chad
 Religion in Chile
 Religion in Costa Rica
 Religion in Côte d'Ivoire
 Religion in Cyprus
 Religion in Denmark
 Religion in East Timor
 Religion in Ecuador
 Religion in El Salvador
 Religion in Eritrea
 Religion in Fiji
 Religion in Finland
 Religion in Gabon
 Religion in Germany
 Religion in Greece
 Religion in Guinea-Bissau
 Religion in Guyana
 Religion in Iceland
 Religion in Jersey
 Religion in Kenya
 Religion in Kiribati
 Religion in Lesotho
 Religion in Liberia
 Religion in Lithuania
 Religion in Luxembourg
 Religion in Mali
 Religion in Mexico
 Religion in Moldova
 Religion in Mozambique
 Religion in Namibia
 Religion in Nauru
 Religion in Nicaragua
 Religion in Niger
 Religion in North Korea
 Religion in North Macedonia
 Religion in Palau
 Religion in Papua New Guinea
 Religion in Paraguay
 Religion in Peru
 Religion in Poland
 Religion in Portugal
 Religion in Romania
 Religion in Samoa
 Religion in Serbia
 Religion in Tanzania
 Religion in the Dominican Republic
 Religion in the Federated States of Micronesia
 Religion in the Maldives
 Religion in the Marshall Islands
 Religion in the Netherlands
 Religion in the United Kingdom
 Religion in Tonga
 Religion in Tuvalu
 Religion in Vanuatu
 Restoration Movement
 Resurrection of Jesus
 Reverend
 Revival Centres International
 Rhoda (biblical figure)
 Roman citizenship
 Russian Orthodox Church Outside Russia
 Russian Orthodox Diocese of Sourozh

S 

 Sacramental union
 Sadducees
 Saint
 Saint Dominic
 Saint Joseph
 Saint Longinus
 Saint Matthias
 Saint Peter
 Saint Philemon
 Saint Publius
 Saint Stephen
 Saint symbolism
 Saint Timothy
 Saint Titus
 Salome
 Salome (disciple)
 Salvation
 Salvation Army
 Samaritan Pentateuch
 Samaritan woman at the well
 Samaritans
 Sanctuary of Sorrow
 Sanhedrin
 Sanhedrin Trial of Jesus
 Sceva
 Scholasticism
 Schwarzenau Brethren
 Scottish Episcopal Church
 Scottish Reformation
 Second Coming
 Second Epistle of John
 Second Epistle of Peter
 Second Epistle to the Corinthians
 Second Epistle to the Thessalonians
 Second Epistle to Timothy
 Second Great Awakening
 Second Vatican Council
 Sedecion of Byzantium
 Septuagint
 Serbian Orthodox Church
 Sergius I of Constantinople
 Sergius Paulus
 Sermon
 Sermon on the Mount
 Servant of God
 Seven Deacons
 Seventh-day Adventist Church
 Seventy disciples
 Sexton (office)
 Silas
 Silvanus of the Seventy
 Simeon (Gospel of Luke)
 Simeon Niger
 Simon Magus
 Simon of Cyrene
 Simon the Leper
 Simon the Zealot
 Simon, brother of Jesus
 Sirach
 Society of Jesus
 Sofer
 Son of God
 Son of God (Christianity)
 Song of Songs
 Sopater
 Southern Baptist Convention
 Split of early Christianity and Judaism
 Stachys the Apostle
 Standing Conference of Orthodox Bishops in America
 Standing Conference of the Canonical Orthodox Bishops in the Americas
 Stephen I of Constantinople
 Superintendent (ecclesiastical)
 Susanna (Book of Daniel)
 Susanna (disciple)
 Swiss Brethren
 Synod of Dort
 Synod of Hippo
 Synoptic Gospels
 Syriac Christianity
 Syriac Orthodox Church
 Syriac versions of the Bible

T 

 Targum
 Temptation of Christ
 Teresa of Ávila
 Tertius of Iconium
 Tertullian
 Textual criticism
 The Beast (Revelation)
 The Brethren Church
 The Church of Jesus Christ of Latter-day Saints
 The Church of Jesus Christ of Latter-day Saints in Australia
 The Church of Jesus Christ of Latter-day Saints in Canada
 The gospel
 The Prayer of Azariah and Song of the Three Holy Children
 The Venerable
 Theodotos I of Constantinople
 Theology of Huldrych Zwingli
 Theophilus (biblical)
 Theudas
 Third Epistle of John
 Third Great Awakening
 Thirty-nine Articles
 Thomas Aquinas
 Thomas Cranmer
 Thomas More
 Thomas Müntzer
 Thomas the Apostle
 Three Angels' Messages
 Tiberius
 Timeline of Christian missions
 Timeline of Christianity
 Timeline of Eastern Orthodoxy in America
 Timeline of the Catholic Church
 Timeline of the English Reformation
 Transfiguration of Jesus
 Tridentine Calendar
 Trinitarianism
 Trinity
 Trophimus
 Twelve Apostles
 Two witnesses
 Tychicus

U 

 U.S. Conference of Mennonite Brethren Churches
 Ukrainian Orthodox Church of Canada
 Union of Utrecht (Old Catholic)
 Unitarianism
 United Church of Canada
 United Church of Christ
 United Free Church of Scotland
 United Methodist Church
 United Pentecostal Church International
 United Reformed Church
 Uniting Church in Australia

V 

 Varghese Payyappilly Palakkappilly
 Veneration
 Verger
 Vestryman
 Vetus Latina
 Vexillum
 Vicar
 Virgin birth of Jesus

W 

 Wesleyan Church
 Wesleyan Holiness Church
 Wesleyan Methodist Church of Australia
 Wesleyan Reform Union
 Wesleyanism
 Western Christianity
 Western Schism
 Westminster Assembly
 Whore of Babylon
 Wisconsin Evangelical Lutheran Synod
 Wisdom literature
 Woman of the Apocalypse
 Women in Christianity
 World Communion of Reformed Churches
 World Convention of Churches of Christ
 World Council of Churches
 World Evangelical Alliance
 World Methodist Council
 World Reformed Fellowship
 Worldwide Church of God

X

Y

Z 

 Zacchaeus
 Zealotry
 Zebedee
 Zechariah (priest)
 Zwinglianism

See also 

 Outline of religion
 Outline of Christianity
 Index of Catholic Church articles
 Index of Eastern Christianity-related articles
 Index of Protestantism-related articles

 
Christianity